Michael “Mike” Okot (born 25 December 1958) is a retired Ugandan sprinter who specialized in the 400 and 800 metres.

Okot finished seventh in 4 x 400 metres relay at the 1984 Summer Olympics, together with teammates John Goville, Moses Kyeswa and Peter Rwamuhanda, in a national record time of 3:02.09 minutes.

On the individual level he participated in 400 m at the 1984 Olympics and 4 x 100 metres relay at the 1988 Summer Olympics without reaching the final. He won a bronze medal in 400 m at the 1982 African Championships, and reached the quarterfinals at the 1983 World Championships. Based in Sweden, he won the Swedish indoor championships in 1988.

Achievements

References

External links

1958 births
Living people
Ugandan male sprinters
Athletes (track and field) at the 1982 Commonwealth Games
Commonwealth Games competitors for Uganda
Athletes (track and field) at the 1984 Summer Olympics
Athletes (track and field) at the 1988 Summer Olympics
Olympic athletes of Uganda
World Athletics Championships athletes for Uganda
20th-century Ugandan people
21st-century Ugandan people